The Brielle School District is a community public school district that serves students in pre-kindergarten through eighth grade from Brielle, in Monmouth County, New Jersey, United States.

As of the 2020–21 school year, the district, comprised of one school, had an enrollment of 512 students and 50.6 classroom teachers (on an FTE basis), for a student–teacher ratio of 10.1:1.

The district is classified by the New Jersey Department of Education as being in District Factor Group "GH", the third-highest of eight groupings. District Factor Groups organize districts statewide to allow comparison by common socioeconomic characteristics of the local districts. From lowest socioeconomic status to highest, the categories are A, B, CD, DE, FG, GH, I and J.

For ninth through twelfth grades, public school students attend Manasquan High School in Manasquan, as part of a sending/receiving relationship with the Manasquan Public Schools, joining students from Avon-by-the-Sea, Belmar, Lake Como, Sea Girt, Spring Lake and Spring Lake Heights at the school. As of the 2020–21 school year, the high school had an enrollment of 1,006 students and 76.9 classroom teachers (on an FTE basis), for a student–teacher ratio of 13.1:1.

School
Brielle Elementary School serves students in grades PreK-8. The school had an enrollment of 509 students in the 2020–21 school year.
Christine Carlson, Principal
Colin Sabia, Vice Principal / Director of Special Services

Administration
Core members of the district's administration are:
Christine Carlson, Superintendent
Diane Quigley, Business Administrator / Board Secretary

Board of education
The district's board of education is comprised of nine members who set policy and oversee the fiscal and educational operation of the district through its administration. As a Type II school district, the board's trustees are elected directly by voters to serve three-year terms of office on a staggered basis, with three seats up for election each year held (since 2012) as part of the November general election.

References

External links
Brielle Elementary School

School Data for the Brielle School District, National Center for Education Statistics

Brielle, New Jersey
New Jersey District Factor Group GH
Public K–8 schools in New Jersey
School districts in Monmouth County, New Jersey